The McCune Mound and Village Site is a prehistoric archaeological site located in Whiteside County, Illinois near the city of Sterling. The site was occupied by Upper Mississippian peoples from roughly 1200 to 1500 A.D.; it is considered part of the Langford tradition, a subset of Upper Mississippian culture found in northwestern Illinois. Modern archaeologists first documented the site in 1961. As a relatively intact site with a single-component habitation, the site was considered to have the potential to provide significant information on the Langford tradition.

The site was added to the National Register of Historic Places on August 16, 1979.

References

Archaeological sites on the National Register of Historic Places in Illinois
National Register of Historic Places in Whiteside County, Illinois
Mounds in Illinois
Mississippian culture